The State Anthem of the Republic of Uzbekistan ( / Ўзбекистон Республикасининг Давлат Мадҳияси) uses the same melody as the anthem of the Uzbek Soviet Socialist Republic, composed by Mutal Burhonov in 1947, when the country was a republic of the Soviet Union. After Uzbekistan gained independence from the Soviet Union, new lyrics by Uzbek poet Abdulla Oripov were adopted.

Lyrics

Official

In other scripts

Notes

References

External links
Uzbekistan Government page on state symbols
Uzbekistan press-service page on state symbols
Uzbekistan: Oʻzbekiston Respublikasining Davlat Madhiyasi - Audio of the national anthem of Uzbekistan, with information and lyrics (archive link)
Himnuszok - A vocal version of the Anthem, featured in "Himnuszok" website.
Uzbekistan Embassy- Uzbekistan embassy page on state symbols

National anthems
Uzbekistani music
National symbols of Uzbekistan
Asian anthems
Uzbek language
National anthem compositions in G major